For the Kenny Rogers album, see Christmas in America.
Alabama is an American country music band composed of Randy Owen, Jeff Cook, Teddy Gentry, and Mark Herndon. Their discography comprises 26 studio albums, including 20 recorded for RCA Records. Alabama also charted 77 songs on the Billboard Hot Country Songs charts, of which 32 reached number one. The band's longest-lasting number one was "Jukebox in My Mind", which spent four weeks at that position in 1990. Several of the band's early-1980s releases also crossed over to the Billboard Hot 100 and Hot Adult Contemporary Tracks charts, including "Feels So Right", "Love in the First Degree", "Take Me Down", and "The Closer You Get", all of which reached top 40 on the Billboard Hot 100.

Studio albums

1970s

1980s

1990s

2000s and 2010s

Compilation albums

1980s and 1990s

2000s and 2010s

Live albums

Tribute albums

Singles

1970s and 1980s

1990s

2000s and 2010s

As a featured artist

Christmas singles

Charted B-sides

Other charted songs

Music videos

Notes

References

External links

Alabama (band)
Discographies of American artists
Discography